Gundu Hirisave Rama Rao was born in Tumkur (Karnataka), India, on 23 August 1937. He is a scientist, entrepreneur and a tenured professor at the Academic Health Center, University of Minnesota. He and Professor John Eaton visited India in 1981 under a National Science Foundation sponsorship (travel grant), to explore opportunities for collaborative research projects. They visited medical institutions from Kashmir in the north to Trivandrum in the south. He again visited India during 1990–93, as a professor and a senior consultant for the government of India under a United Nations Development Program (UNDP) called TOKTEN (Transfer of Knowledge Through Expatriate Nationals) sponsored by the Council of Scientific and Industrial Research. He is a member of the Minneapolis University Rotary Club . He is listed as a Senior Fulbright Scholar in the Roster. He is an active member of Rotary E-Club, RI.3190, Bangalore, India.

He is the founder of the South Asian Society on Atherosclerosis and Thrombosis and AayuSmart LLC, an IT-supported web-based health management company. He has been actively involved in creating awareness, developing educational and preventive programs for the prevention of non-communicable diseases such as hypertension, obesity, metabolic diseases, type 2-diabetes vascular diseases and stroke. Dr. Rao has spent close to 40 years in Minnesota. Currently he lives in Maryland with his wife, two children, and three grandchildren, and spends half of his time in India, developing collaborative projects related to improving health care.

Early life
Gundu Rao was born in Tumkur, Karnataka, India. His ancestors on his father's side hailed from Hirisave (Hassan District) and on his mother's side from Thimmasandra, a small village 20 miles from Tumkur. He did his primary education from Hindu Gurukula. He did his middle school education in Government Western Middle School and Old Middle School near the District Courts. He graduated from Government High School in 1953. He studied at the First Grade College and obtained his BSc degree with Chemistry, Botany and Zoology in 1957. He obtained his BSc (Hons) in Zoology (1958) and MSc in Entomology (1959) from Poona University.

Early career in India
He worked at the Commonwealth Institute of Biological Control, Bangalore, for almost two years. During this time he spent 8 months at Dalhousie (Himachal Pradesh) collecting and breeding ladybird beetles for export to the USA. That was the year when the Dalai Lama came to India via Dalhousie. He spent few months in the hill station Coonoor working on pests of tea. After resigning from this Institute, he worked in the Central Food Technological Research Institute, Mysore for five years (1960–65) on problems related to the control of pests that infest food products. During this period he was recipient of junior and senior research fellowship of Council of Scientific and Industrial Research. Since various administrative complications prevented recognition of his work towards a PhD program, he left for the US to obtain a PhD degree.

Early career in USA
He studied for his PhD in Agriculture Entomology at the Kansas State University  and specialized in Grain Science Technology. He did a year of post-doctoral work in the Department of Entomology, Texas A&M University, (1969), on problems related to isolation and purification of polyhedral virus (6). He joined University of Minnesota in 1970 as a faculty in the Department of Entomology, Fisheries and Wildlife. He worked on isolation and characterization fungal toxins (10,11). He joined Prof Marion Andrews in the Department of Pharmacology in 1971 and worked on drug metabolizing enzymes (12,13).

In 1972 he started working with James G White in the  Department of Pediatrics, who was working on the morphology and ultra structure of blood platelets. He collaborated with Prof White on platelet physiology and pharmacology for over three decades and published over 200 articles on the subject in peer-reviewed journals. He shared as co-investigator NIH research grants for over 3 decades including the NIH MERIT award (R37) for ten years (1982–92). Independent of this collaboration, he also was the recipient of two NIH/STTR grants for development of Point-of-Care medical devices (Detection of aspirin resistance in human subjects: 1R41HL081979-01 and Detection bacteria in blood bags: 1R41 HL079854-01).

He spent a summer in King's College London, in the Department of Surgery with Prof. Vijay Kakkar in 1988 (130 ). The following summer he visited the Department of Biochemistry, Royal College of Surgeons and worked with Prof Neville Crawford (117). In the summer of 1989 he visited Thrombosis Research Institute, Chelsea, London and worked again with Prof. Kakkar's group. In the summer of 1992 he taught at the Institute of Human Physiology, University of Padua, Padua, Italy(157). In early 1990s he recommended the following institutions in India for the recognition by the International Federation of Cardiologists as center of excellence in thrombosis:
G.B Panth Hospital, New Delhi,Post Graduate Institute (PGI) of Medical Sciences, Chandigarh, PGI Lucknow, Cardiovascular and Thoracic Institute,KEM Hospital, Mumbai, Sri Jayadeva Institute of Cardiology, Bangalore.

Contributions

University of Minnesota
He visited India in 1981 with John W Eaton, Professor of Molecular Anthropology, University of Minnesota to explore opportunities to establish Collaborative programs. During this visit to India, he visited Medical Institutions at Mumbai (Hematology and Genetics), Delhi (AIIMS, Malaria Research Institute), Chandigarh (PGI), Srinagar (Medical College: high altitude physiology), Hyderabad (Genetics), Chennai (PGI, Taramani), Vellore (Christian Medical College) and Bangalore (Indian Institute of Science).

As an international adviser to the Office of the International Programs, University of Minnesota, he suggested following Medical institutions in India and Nepal for student and faculty exchange program: Tribhuvan University, Nepal, PGI, Chandigarh, Escort Heart Institute, New Delhi, PGI Lucknow, Institute of Immuno-hematology, Mumbai, Sri Jayadeva Institute of Medical Sciences, Indian Institute of Science, Bangalore; Sri Chitra Tiruanl Institute for Medical Sciences and Technology, Trivandrum. He also recommended following individuals for honorary professorship in the International Health at the University of Minnesota: Dr Naresh Trehan (Escort Heart Institute, New Delhi), Dr. Dipika Mohanty (Institute of Immuno-hematology, Mumbai), DR Prabhudev (Jayadeva Institute of Cardiology, Bangalore), Dr Mohandas (Sri Chitra Tirunal Institute for Medical Sciences, Trivandrum), Dr Ramdas Pai ( Manipal Academy, Manipal).

As a Rotarian he has developed matching grants from Minneapolis/University Club USD 25,000.00, to improve the educational activities of TTK/Rotary Blood Bank in Bangalore, India. He also raised a similar amount from Rotary International, to improve the Clinical facility at Jnana Sanjeevini Diabetes Clinic, Bangalore. Now that he is on a phased retirement at the University of Minnesota, he spends 4 months a year in Bangalore, India developing collaborative programs to improve drug development, medical devices development and IT supported health care.

International Activities

He visited India in 1990, 91, and 92 under the TOKTEN program as senior consultant to the Government of India. During these visits, he spent time at the G. B. Pant Hospital, Maulana Abdul Kalam Medical College, All India Institute of Medical Sciences, New Delhi; Institute of Immuno-hematology, King Edward Medical Hospital, Mumbai; King George Hospital, and Post Graduate Institute, Lucknow; Nizam's Institute of Medical Sciences, Hyderabad; Madras Diabetes Research Foundation, Chennai, Sri. Jayadeva Institute of Cardiology, Indian Institute of Sciences, Bangalore; Sri Chitra Tiruanl Institute For Medical Sciences and Technology, Trivandrum.

Prevention of Diabetes and Heart Disease

His visits to India under the TOKTEN program for three years in a row, made him aware of the very high incidence of Type-2 diabetes and Coronary Artery Disease in South Asians. With seed money of US$10, 000 from the International Society on Thrombosis and Hemostasis, USA, he started a professional Society called The South Asian Society for Atherosclerosis and Thrombosis (SASAT) in Minnesota to create awareness and develop educational and preventive programs of the prevention of these diseases in South Asians. He has been organizing international conferences on Atherosclerosis and Thrombosis, in India (Mumbai 1994, Bangalore 1996, New Delhi 1998, Mumbai 2000, Chennai 2002, Hyderabad 2004, Bangalore 2008, New Delhi 2007, 2008).  He has published four books under the aegis of SASAT in India. He has raised more than a million dollars for education and research activities of SASAT in India. SASAT has given awards to clinicians, researchers, teachers and accomplished health care professionals in India (www.sasat.org).

Current activities

Currently he is working with three major professional societies as scientific adviser: South Asian Society on Atherosclerosis and Thrombosis, North American Thrombosis Forum and International Union of Angiology. He is working on regulatory issues related to outsourcing of generic drugs, issues related to characterization and development of biologics or bio-similars. He is also working on establishing a platform in India for the development of biomarker assays for the early detection of cancer and cardiovascular diseases and hand held medical devices for monitoring these assays. Another area of interest is development of indigenous drugs and cost effective self-diagnostic medical devices. To accomplish these goals he established a company in Bengaluru: aayusmart (www.aayusmart.com). For the first time anywhere in the world this company is trying to provide access to the individuals the health records via web (mobile personal health records: mPHRs). The company is also developing electronic alerts for patient safety, or quality assessment of medical care and a robust work place wellness program to improve the overall health of the individual.

He is also an Honorary Professor at Sri Chitra Tirunal Institute of Medical Sciences and Technology, Thiruvananthapuram (Trivandrum), Kerala State, India, Sri Devaraj Medical Academy and Research Centre (Deemed University), Kolar, Karnataka State, India, JSS Academy (Deemed University), Mysore, Karnataka State, India, RV Engineering and Dental Colleges, Bangalore, Karnataka, India and Rajiv Gandhi University of Health Sciences, Bangalore, Karnataka, India. He is Scientific Adviser to Genelon Life Sciences, Yelahanka, Bengaluru, Stellixir Biotechnologies, Peenya Industrial Estate, Bengaluru. He also serves as the Technology Adviser to Medical Device Development Group od National Design Research Forum (NDRF), Institute of Engineers, Bengaluru

Future Goals

Future goals include development of a large data base on this diverse ethnic group, develop a mobile diagnostic platform with v-sat capability to reach the rural community, improve the connectivity of the health care providers at 600 districts and 33,000 primary health care facility with cost effective diagnostic platform and a web-based consulting service. Diagnosis of diseases also will necessitate the need for cost effective treatment plans. Serious considerations will be given to develop a total integrative health management so that it will cover the largest section of the society. One example of simplification that we are contemplating is to develop capability to do all the blood chemistry on a cell phone like platform, so that data could be obtained with a drop of blood, stored and transmitted to a web based consulting platform or to a personal physician for further interpretation and advise. Similarly we could also include on such a mobile platform diagnostic capability to monitor pulse flow of the blood in regional vascular beds or to monitor the heart rate, EKG (ECG) blood oxygen and various other parameters. By exploring these avenues we will be able to bring the clinic to the individual instead of individual going to clinic for normal risk factor detection and management.

Another area of interest is creation of awareness and education of the individuals. Indian Space Research Organization has a dedicated satellite (EDUSAT). They have connected tele-terminals to more than 10, 000 colleges. This vast network could be used for educational purposes for a nominal cost. Using SASAT platform, he is planning to create a wide educational network.

India is ranked number one in the list of nations with highest incidence of Type-2 diabetes. There are more than 30 million adults who suffer from this disease. There are equal numbers of people who have the disease and not diagnosed. To add to this complexity millions of individuals are in pre-diabetic condition. According to WHO estimate this number will increase by 200% in the net decade. Individuals with diabetes have 2-4 fold higher risks to have acute vascular events such as heart attack or stroke. Indians have the highest incidence of coronary artery disease compared to any other ethnic group in the world. To create awareness and develop educational and preventive programs Dr Rao started SASAT in USA in 1993. Prevention of these chronic metabolic diseases is cost effective and is probably the only choice for the masses. Even if the risk factors for these diseases are detected early, not all individuals can afford the expensive treatment options.

It has been estimated that one third of all the children born in India are of low birth weight (LBW). It has been demonstrated by many studies that these LBW babies are at risk for developing hypertension, diabetes and vascular diseases. One way to reduce this health burden is to develop a strong maternal nutrition program for the pregnant women, so that the number of LBW newborn can be drastically reduced.

The general diet of South Asians by and large is very rich in carbohydrates and this puts a great demand on the insulin secretion. It is therefore essential to improve the general diet of the population. Fortification of foods with nutrients is one cost-effective choice. Alternately genetic engineering of better cereals, fruits and vegetable also could be encouraged. Finally it is very well established that life style changes reduce the disease burden of chronic diseases. Life style changes including work place wellness programs should be encouraged to reduce the disease burden in this population. Prevention in whatever way possible is the primary goal to address this epidemic.

Awards and Fellowships
 Fellow, Royal Entomological Society, London.
 Fellow, International Academy of Clinical and Applied Thrombosis and Hemostasis, USA.
 Fellow, Indian College of Cardiology, India.
 Distinguished Career Award, International Union of Angiology, France.
Distinguished Career Award, World Clinical Cardiology Conference, 2009
Life Time Achievement Award, 2nd International Conference on Contemporary Biologists, India
Paul Harris Fellow, USA

Professional Society Affiliations
Member			Society for Biomaterials, USA
Life Member		Society for Biomaterials and Artificial Organs (India)
Rotary Club   		Paul Harris Fellow
Life Fellow		The Commonwealth Association For Mental Handicap Developmental Disabilities, United Kingdom
Member		      	Indian College of Cardiology, India
Founder CEO 	        South Asian Society on Atherosclerosis and Thrombosis (SASAT)
Member		       	American Society for Biochemistry and Molecular Biology (ASBMB)
Member			The Biochemical Society, London, United Kingdom
Life Member		The Academy of Environmental Biology, India
Member			The New York Academy of Sciences, NY, USA
Member			American Association for the Advancement of Science (AAAS), USA
Member			American Society of Hematology, USA
Life Member		Friends of Vellore, Christian Medical College, India
Member			American Association of Clinical Chemists (AACC), USA
Member			National Thrombosis Council, AHA, USA
Member			International Society for Thrombosis and Haemostasis (ISTH)
Member			American Association of Pathologists (AAP), USA
Life Member		Chronobiological Society of India, India
Member			Association of Scientists of Indian Origin in America, USA
Fellow		 	National Academy of Clinical Biochemists, USA
Member			American Association for Clinical Chemists, USA
Member			Minnesota Chromatography Forum, USA
Member			Sigma Xi and Gamma Sigma Delta, USA
Founder			Academy of Pest Control Sciences, India
Life Member		Food and Grain Technologists Research Association, India
Life Member		Entomological Society of India, India
Fellow			Royal Entomological Society, London, United Kingdom
Member			American Association of Blood Banks
Member      		International Society of Blood Transfusion
			International Academy of Clinical and Applied Thrombosis
Board			North American Thrombosis Forum
Board			International Union of Angiology
Founder Director, Karnataka Hybrid Micro Devices, Bangalore, India
Hon. Professor, Sri Chitra Tiruanl Institute For Medical Sciences and Technology, Trivandrum.
Board, Manipal Acunova, Bangalore
Founder Chairman, Aayusmart. LLC, Bangalore.
Chief Technology Officer, Stellixir Biotech Pvt Ltd, Bangalore

Bibliography
Rao GHR: (Editor): Handbook of Platelet Physiology and Pharmacology, Kluwer Academic Publishers, Boston, 1999. 
Rao GHR: (Editor): Coronary Artery Disease in South Asians: Epidemiology, Risk Factors, Prevention. Jaypee Medical Publishers, New Delhi, India, 2001, .
Rao GHR: (Editor): Coronary Artery Disease: Risk Factors, Pathophysiology and Prevention. Jaypee Medical Publishers, New Delhi, India. 2005, .
Rao GHR: (Editor): Handbook of Blood Banking and Transfusion Medicine, Jaypee Medical Publishers, New Delhi, India, 2006, .
Rao GHR: (Editor): Diabetes Mellitus (Type-2): Epidemiology, Risk Management and Prevention. Jaypee Medical Publishers, New Delhi, India. 2007, 
Rao, GHR: (Editor): Clinical Handbook of Management of Antithrombotic & Thrombolytic Therapy.Kontentworx, New Delhi, India.2014.

References

www.researchgate.net/profile/Gundu_Rao/publications/

www.mendeley.com/Gundu Rao

http://scholar.google.co.uk/citations?user=jJ_QfVMAAAAJ&hi=en&oi=ao

1937 births
Indian hematologists
Living people
People from Tumkur
Scientists from Karnataka
20th-century Indian biologists